Super Champ (수퍼챔프) is a South Korean magazine produced by Daiwon C.I.  It is available only online, and specializes in serializing domestic and imported comics.  Its first issue was published in 2006, and it is released on the last day of each month.  Following publication in Super Champ, individual series are later collected into volumes and published in hard copy form under the Super Champ Comics (SC Comics) imprint.

Serializations
The following titles are or have been serialized in Super Champ and/or printed under the Super Champ Comics imprint.

References

External links
 Super Champ @ Daiwon C.I.

Manhwa magazines
Magazines established in 2006
Anime and manga magazines
2006 establishments in South Korea
Magazines published in South Korea
Monthly magazines
Online magazines